The North Carolina State Board of Dental Examiners is an agency of the Government of North Carolina. Its purpose is to regulate the dental industry in the state. Its headquarters are in Morrisville in the Research Triangle area.

See also

Government of North Carolina

References

External links
 North Carolina State Board of Dental Examiners

State agencies of North Carolina
Dental organizations based in the United States
Medical and health organizations based in North Carolina